Duck ague, also buck fever or buck ague, is a hunting term for the yips, in which a marksman or hunter, before taking a shot with either a gun or bow in a tense situation, loses mental quietude and misses the shot.

Popular culture
In the movie Deliverance, Jon Voight suffers from duck ague before shooting a wild deer, after which Burt Reynolds' character describes the phenomenon, saying "Hell, I've known tournament archers, damn good shots, never out of the five ring. Draw down on a live animal, they get buck ague."

1951 movie "Fort Worth", Warner Bros, in the final scene in the newspaper office, David Brian tells Randolph Scott, "now don't get buck ague".

References

Hunting